Pleasure Island was an amusement park located in Wakefield, Massachusetts. The park, billed as the "Disneyland of the Northeast", was in business from 1959 to 1969. During its short existence it went through several owners and was financially handicapped by New England's relatively short summers.

History
Pleasure Island was founded by William Hawkes, publisher of Child Life magazine, and designed by Cornelius Vanderbilt Wood, a designer of Disneyland and Lake Havasu City.

Covering , the park featured a plethora of rides and other attractions, including the Space Rocket ride, the Pirate Ride, the Moby-Dick ride (which featured a spouting mechanical whale rising from the depths), the Wreck of the Hesperus (dark ride), the Old Chisholm Trail (dark ride), theme restaurants, a shopping area, an arcade, mini-golf (from 1967), a carousel, Monkey Island, and many others.

Actors would stage mock gunfights in the Western City or threaten to attack riders on the boat rides. The park's Old Smokey Railroad Line was a  narrow gauge railroad using equipment leased from the Edaville Railroad.

Another park feature was the Show Bowl, where performers such as Ricky Nelson, Michael Landon, The Modernaires, the Three Stooges, Clayton Moore, Don Ameche, and Cesar Romero appeared.

Product placement and branding played a part in some attractions, such as the Grist Mill which featured Pepperidge Farm products and the Pepsi-Cola Diamond Lil Theater. Its cartoon character mascot for a time was Popeye.

Today, the land formerly occupied by the park is now Edgewater Office Park. The pond used for the Moby Dick ride is part of the property, with remnants of the ride noticeable on the edge of the pond. The #5 steam locomotive that used to serve at Pleasure Island is still up and running today and can be found at the Wiscasset, Waterville and Farmington Railway Museum, located in Alna, Maine. It has been rechristened the #10.

As of December 10, 2022, the Moby Dick animatronic was confirmed to still be in the pond. The Whale has sunken into its tracks but is otherwise in decent condition.

Attractions
Source:

Animal Land
Barn & Slide
Burro Trail
Camera Shop
Carousel
Chisolm Trail
Chowder House
Christmas Wonderland
Country Store
Covered Wagon
Dagett Chocolate Company's "Handspun" Shop
Engine City
Friend's Baked Beanery
Front Gate
Goldpan Gulch & Gold Panning Operation
Golf (18 hole mini-golf installed 1967)
Helicopter Ride
Heritage Museum
Hood's Gay Nineties Ice Cream Parlor
Horseless Carriage Ride originally "Jenney"
Indian Village
Kartland
Lighthouse
MagicLand: Crooked House - Slanted Shanty - Magnetic House - Captain's House
Moby Dick Ride
Merchants National Bank
Monkey Island
Pavilion
Pepperidge Farm Bakery
Picnic Area
Kaptain Kidd's Pirate Cove
Pirate Ride
Quannapowitt Publishers Print Shop
Old Smokey Railroad Line
Railroad Station (former Greenwood Depot)
Roundabout
Saloon, originally Pepsi-Cola's Diamond Lil Show
Shooting Gallery
Shopping Lane
Showbowl
Space Rocket
Stagecoach Ride
Swift and Company's great meat market
Treasure Digging Island
United Nations Theatre
Water Buffalo Land & Sea Ride
Western City
Wreck of the Hesperus

Pop culture
Certain scenes from the film Charly were filmed at Pleasure Island.

The ride "Wreck of the Hesperus" followed the theme from the poem The Wreck of the Hesperus written by American poet Henry Wadsworth Longfellow.

See also
List of amusement parks in New England
List of defunct amusement parks
Amusement ride

Notes

External links
Friends of Pleasure Island web site

Amusement parks in Massachusetts
Defunct amusement parks in the United States
1958 establishments in Massachusetts
1970 disestablishments in Massachusetts
Buildings and structures in Middlesex County, Massachusetts
Wakefield, Massachusetts
Amusement parks opened in 1958
Amusement parks closed in 1970